Déjame Entrar is the tenth studio album recorded by Colombian singer-songwriter Carlos Vives, It was released on November 6, 2001 (see 2001 in music). It won for Grammy Award for Best Traditional Tropical Latin Album in the 44th Annual Grammy Awards on February 27, 2002.

Track listing
 "Déjame entrar" (Andrés Castro, Carlos Vives, Martín Madera) – 3:57
 "Carito" (Carlos Vives, Egidio Cuadrado) – 3:38
 "Amor latino" (Carlos Vives, Martín Madera) – 4:10
 "Luna nueva" (Carlos Vives, Martín Madera) – 3:36
 "Papadió" (Andrés Castro, Carlos Iván Medina, Carlos Vives) – 3:27
 "Quiero verte sonreír" (Andrés Castro, Carlos Vives, Carlos Huertas) – 3:18
 "A las doce menos diez" (Carlos Vives) – 4:01
 "María Teresa" (Andrés Castro, Emilio Estefan, Carlos Vives) – 3:36
 "Décimas" (Carlos Vives, Martín Madera) – 3:33
 "Santa Elegia" (Carlos Vives) – 3:52
 "Déjame entrar (Bonus track)" (Andrés Castro, Carlos Vives, Martín Madera) – 3:57

Personnel 
 Carlos Vives – vocals, choir
 Archie Peña – percussion, conga, drums
 Sebastián Krys – choir
 Mayte Montero – maraca, bagpipes
 Ramón Benítez – bombard
 Egidio Cuadrado – accordion, choir
 Andrés Castro – acousticgGuitar, electric guitar, charango, choir
 Carlos Huertas – choir
 Pablo Bernal – drums
 Tedoy Mullet – trombone, trumpet
 Carlos Iván Medina – choir
 Luis Ángel Pastor – double bass, six-string bass
 Paquito Hechavarría – piano
 Martín Madera – choir

Technical personnel 
 Carlos Vives – arranger, producer
 Scott Canto – engineer
 Mike Couzzi – engineer
 Bob Ludwig – mastering
 Sebastián Krys – arranger, producer, engineer
 Kevin Dillon – logistics
 Mayte Montero – arranger
 Lucho Correa – graphic design
 Egidio Cuadrado – arranger
 Andrés Castro – arranger, producer
 David Heuer – engineer
 Javier Garza – engineer
 Steve Menezes – studio coordinator
 José A. Maldonado – logistics
 Trevor Fletcher – studio coordinator
 Luis Ángel Pastor – arranger
 Emilio Estefan Jr. – producer
 Eric Schilling – engineer
 John Thomas II – engineer
 Ron Taylor – engineer

Sales and certifications

See also
List of number-one Billboard Top Latin Albums of 2001
List of number-one Billboard Tropical Albums from the 2000s

References

External links 
 

2001 albums
Carlos Vives albums
Spanish-language albums
Albums produced by Emilio Estefan
Albums produced by Sebastian Krys
Grammy Award for Best Tropical Latin Album